Samseongsan (삼성산; 三聖山) is the name of two mountains in South Korea:
Samseongsan (Gyeongsangbuk-do) 
Samseongsan (Seoul/Gyeonggi-do)